David Ramsay Anderson (2 May 1888 – 27 May 1962) was an Australian rules footballer who played with Essendon and University in the Victorian Football League (VFL).

Footnotes

References

Holmesby, Russell & Main, Jim (2007). The Encyclopedia of AFL Footballers. 7th ed. Melbourne: Bas Publishing.

External links

Essendon Football Club profile

1888 births
1962 deaths
VFL/AFL players born outside Australia
Australian rules footballers from Victoria (Australia)
University Football Club players
Essendon Football Club players
South Yarra Football Club players
Scottish emigrants to Australia
Sportspeople from Edinburgh
Scottish players of Australian rules football